The 1458 papal conclave (August 16–19), convened after the death of Pope Callixtus III, elected as his successor Cardinal Enea Silvio Piccolomini who took the name Pius II.

Death of Callixtus III
Pope Callixtus III, the first pope of the House of Borgia, died on August 6, 1458. He was severely criticized due to his nepotism and devotion towards his compatriots of Catalonia, making him very unpopular among the rather xenophobic Roman populace. After the Pope's death an open revolt against him broke out and some of his partisans (e.g. his nephew Pedro Luis de Borja) had to flee Rome.

List of participants

At the time of Callixtus' death, there were 27 living cardinals, of whom 19 were in Rome, but on August 14 Cardinal Domenico Capranica, archpriest of the College, unexpectedly died. Participating in the conclave were 18 out of the 26 members of the Sacred College:

Eight electors were Italian, five Spaniards, two French, two Greeks and one Portuguese. Seven of them were created by Callistus III, six by Eugenius IV, four by Nicholas V and one by Martin V.

Absentees

Eight cardinals did not participate in this conclave:

Of the absentee cardinals four were creations of Eugenius IV, two of Nicholas V and one of Callixtus III. Pierre de Foix was the last surviving cardinal of the Great Western Schism and was elevated by Pisan Antipope John XXIII.

Among them there were three French, two Germans, one Spaniard, one Italian and the one Hungarian.

Candidates to the papacy

The principal concerns in the conclave of 1458 arose from the rapid rise of the effective power and influence of the French monarchy in the closing years of the Hundred Years War, which had recently ended with the French victory. The principal Italian states – Kingdom of Naples, Republic of Genoa and Duchy of Milan – feared a rebirth of French interest in Italian affairs and tried to prevent the elevation of a French pope at all costs. The official candidate of the Milanese was Domenico Capranica. The campaign for his election in the pre-conclave period was so successful that it appeared almost certain that he would be elected to the papacy. But Cardinal Capranica died suddenly on August 14, 1458, two days before the beginning of the conclave, leaving his party in great confusion. Ottone de Carretto, ambassador of Milan in Rome, made the quick and unconsulted decision to support Cardinal Enea Piccolomini and managed to convince Latino Orsini, one of the most influential cardinals, to back him in this action. The principal candidate of the pro-French party was d'Estouteville. Bessarion, Torquemada and Calandrini also were considered papabile.

The conclave

Eighteen cardinals entered the conclave in Vatican on August 16. Initially they subscribed to the conclave capitulation, which obliged the elect to continue the crusade against the Ottoman Empire and to give more welfare to poorer cardinals.

The first scrutiny took place only on August 18. Cardinals Piccolomini and Calandrini received five votes each, while none of the others obtained more than three. At this point French Cardinal d'Estouteville started an intensive simoniacal campaign for his own candidature. He promised the office of Vice-Chancellor to the Cardinal of Avignon and offered other bribes to the Greek cardinals. On August 18 in the evening he was certain that he would obtain at least eleven votes on the following morning But the opposite Italian party also lost no time. During the night Cardinal Pietro Barbo called together all the other Italian cardinals except Prospero Colonna and proposed to them that, of them all, the one most likely to obtain the required majority of two thirds was Piccolomini, and that all should support him on the following day.

Election of Pius II

The results of the second ballot on August 19 in the morning were a greatly disappointing surprise for d'Estouteville. He received only six votes – those of de Coëtivy, Colonna, Bessarion, Fieschi, Torquemada, and Castiglione. Cardinal Piccolomini obtained nine votes – those of Barbo, Orsini, Calandrini, Isidore of Kiev, de Mella, de La Cerda, Jaime de Portugal, del Mila y Borja, and that of d'Estouteville, who hesitated to vote for himself but certainly did not consider Piccolomini a serious rival. The votes of Rodrigo Borgia, Giacomo Tebaldi and Enea Piccolomini fell to other candidates. After announcing the results, Cardinal Dean opened the customary procedure of the accessus. There was a long silence broken by Rodrigo Borgia who changed his vote to Piccolomini. Then the partisans of d'Estouteville made an attempt to adjourn the session, but Cardinal Tebaldi also changed his vote to Piccolomini, who needed only one vote more for the election. At this point Cardinal Colonna arose to give his vote. Cardinals Rouen and Bessarion attempted to subdue him forcefully but Colonna was able to free himself from the scuffle to proclaim "I also vote for the Cardinal of Siena, and I make him Pope!"  The rest of the adherents of the Cardinal of Rouen could do nothing but change their votes too, and a few minutes later Cardinal Bessarion congratulated Piccolomini on his unanimous election to the papacy.

Cardinal Enea Silvio Piccolomini accepted his election and took the name Pius II. On September 3, 1458, he was solemnly crowned on the steps of the patriarchal Vatican Basilica by Cardinal Prospero Colonna, protodeacon of S. Giorgio in Velabro.

In popular culture
The proceedings of the election of Pius II were the basis of the 2006 film The Conclave.

Notes

Sources
 
 Salvador Miranda: conclave of 1458
 Francis Burkle-Young “Papal elections in the Fifteenth Century: the election of Pius II
 Vatican History: Konklave 1458

1458
15th-century elections
1458
15th-century Catholicism
15th century in Europe
1458 in Europe